Isaac Mwesigwa   is a Ugandan businessman and football administrator. He serves as the chief executive officer of Express FC a Ugandan football club since 20 May 2020.

Background and education
Mwesigwa was born in Kampala District.

Career
He has served in various organisations such as the Network Operations Centre Manager for Liquid Telecom and Support Engineer with UNESCO Accra, Ghana and currently he is the Technical and Support Manager for Ntest, Inc (an American Fiber Optics Company based in Minneapolis, USA) representing Africa, Middle East, Asia and parts of Europe. 
He represented various players in Uganda like Allan Okello, Julius Poloto, Mustafa Kizza and Peter Magambo among others.  He is also the founding chairman of Futsal Association Uganda (FAU).  
On 29 May 2020, Mwesigwa was announced as the new chief executive officer for Express FC replacing Hamza Jjunju.

References

External links
CEO Isaac Mwesigwa’s New Year Message.
Reports: New coach, CEO in the pipeline at Express FC
Mwesigwa Of Express FC Is The Only Empowered Club CEO In The UPL
Express FC: A steep hill that awaits Isaac Mwesigwa to climb | The Touchline Sports
Glorious Days Are Coming Back At Express- CEO Isaac Mwesigwa 
Wankuluku Stadium Under Renovation – Isaac Mwesigwa

Ugandan football executives
People from Kampala
Living people
Year of birth missing (living people)